The 2023 Women's Six Nations Championship, known as the TikTok Women's Six Nations for marketing purposes, will be the 22nd series of the Women's Six Nations Championship, an annual women's rugby union competition between England, France, Ireland, Italy, Scotland and Wales. It will be held from 25 March to 29 April 2023.

England enter the tournament as defending champions, having completed a grand slam in 2022.

Participants

Squads

Table

Table ranking rules

 Four points are awarded for a win.
 Two points are awarded for a draw.
 A bonus point is awarded to a team that scores four or more tries, or loses by seven points or fewer.
 Three bonus points are awarded to a team that wins all five of their matches (a Grand Slam). This ensures that a Grand Slam winning team would top the table with at least 23 points, as another team could lose one match while winning two bonus points and win the other four matches while winning four bonus points for a maximum of 22 points.
 Tiebreakers
 If two or more teams are tied on table points, the team with the better points difference (points scored against points conceded) is ranked higher.
 If the above tiebreaker fails to separate tied teams, the team that scores the higher number of total tries (including penalty tries) in their matches is ranked higher.
 If two or more teams remain tied after applying the above tiebreakers then those teams will be placed at equal rank; if the tournament has concluded and more than one team is placed first then the title will be shared between them.

Fixtures

Round 1

Round 2

Round 3

Round 4

Round 5

Broadcast

References

Women's Six Nations Championship
Women's rugby union
Six Nations Championship
Six Nations Championship
Women's Six Nations
2022–23 in Irish rugby union
2022–23 in English rugby union
2022–23 in Welsh rugby union
2022–23 in Scottish rugby union
2022–23 in French rugby union
2022–23 in Italian rugby union
2022–23 in European women's rugby union
2023 in English women's sport
2023 in French women's sport
2023 in Italian women's sport
2023 in Irish women's sport
2023 in Scottish women's sport
2023 in Welsh women's sport